Kreshnik Çipi (born 15 February 1958) is an Albanian retired football player and was a member of the Assembly of the Republic of Albania for the Democratic Party of Albania.

Football career

Club
Çipi started out as a winger, moved to fullback and ended up as a central defender. He spent his entire playing career with hometown club Flamurtari in the 1980s, captaining the team during the club's golden years involving fellow international players like Sokol Kushta, Rrapo Taho, Petro Ruçi, Alfred Ferko and Alfred Zijai.

International
He made his debut for Albania in an October 1980 FIFA World Cup qualification match against Bulgaria and earned a total of 7 caps, scoring no goals. His final international was an April 1992 FIFA World Cup qualification match against Spain.

Honours
Albanian Superliga: 1
 1991

Albanian Cup: 2
 1985, 1988

Personal life
His nephew Geri also played for Flamurtari and the national team.

References

External links

1958 births
Living people
People from Vlorë
Association football central defenders
Albania international footballers
Flamurtari Vlorë players
Democratic Party of Albania politicians
Members of the Parliament of Albania
Albanian sportsperson-politicians
21st-century Albanian politicians
Footballers from Vlorë
Albanian footballers